Isometroides is a genus of scorpions in the Buthidae family with two species. It is endemic to, and found widely across, inland mainland Australia, and was first described by German arachnologist Eugen von Keyserling in 1885.

Species
 Isometroides vescus (Karsch, 1880)
 Isometroides angusticaudus Keyserling, 1885
 
The genus has sometimes been considered monotypic, with I. angusticaudus a synonym of I. vescus.

Distribution and habitat
Found across much of inland Australia, the scorpions occur in woodland and semi-arid country.

Behaviour
The scorpions are specialised predators of burrowing spiders.

References

 

 
 
Scorpions of Australia
Scorpion genera
Endemic fauna of Australia
Fauna of New South Wales
Fauna of the Northern Territory
Fauna of Queensland
Fauna of South Australia
Fauna of Victoria (Australia)
Fauna of Western Australia
Animals described in 1885
Taxa named by Eugen von Keyserling